The Longford Prize is an annual award presented in the United Kingdom to an organization, group, or individuals working in the field of social or penal reform. It was established in 2002 in honor of Lord Longford, a lifelong penal reform campaigner. It is sponsored by both The Independent and The Daily Telegraph, organised in association with the Prison Reform Trust, and is presented at the annual Longford Lecture.

The prize is usually awarded to someone who has made a difference by their initiative and resourcefulness in prisoners' lives. The prize is sponsored by the McGrath Charitable Trust.

Nominations and judges
Candidates are nominated by the testimony of peers and/or persons who have benefited from their work. These submissions are reviewed by a panel of judges, members of the Prison Reform Trust and New Bridge. The panel is chaired by former prison governor and Longford Trust trustee, John Podmore.

In 2017, the judges for the Longford Prize were: Lord Ramsbotham (formerly His Majesty's Chief Inspector of Prisons), Chloe Billington, Mary Riddell, Peter Stanford, and a representative of the sponsors, The McGrath Charitable Trust.

Past winners

See also

 The Longford Trust
 The Longford Lectures
 Earl of Longford

References

External links
 Frank Longford Charitable Trust

Humanitarian and service awards
Human rights awards
Imprisonment and detention
Prison reform
Penal system in the United Kingdom